Viöl (North Frisian: Fjåål) is a municipality in the district of Nordfriesland, in Schleswig-Holstein, Germany. It is situated approximately 12 km northeast of Husum, and 30 km southwest of Flensburg.

Viöl is the seat of the Amt of (collective municipality) Viöl.

A variety of South Jutlandic was spoken there until 1937, called "Fjoldedansk".

References

Nordfriesland